Sandrock or Sand rock may refer to:

 Sand Rock, Alabama, a town in the United States
 Sand Rock Peak (California), a mountain in the United States
 Sandrock Formation, a geological formation in England
 Adele Sandrock (1863–1937), German-Dutch actress
 Helmut Sandrock (born 1956), German football administrator

See also 
 Sandstone
 Beachrock
 HMS Rocksand, several ships
 Rock Sand, a British racehorse

German-language surnames
Surnames of German origin